Emil Millán de la Oliva (born 24 July 2001) is a Swedish long-distance runner. In 2020, he competed in the men's race at the 2020 World Athletics Half Marathon Championships held in Gdynia, Poland.

References

External links 
 

Living people
2001 births
Place of birth missing (living people)
Swedish male middle-distance runners
Swedish male long-distance runners